The Habar Gidir (Somali: Habar Gidir, Arabic: هبر جدير) is a major subclan of the Hawiye. The clan has produced many prominent Somali figures, including the first Prime Minister of Somalia Abdullahi Issa Mohamud and Somalia's fifth President Abdiqasim Salad Hassan.

Overview
The Habar Gidir are part of the Hiraab. The Hiraab consists of the Mudulood, Habar Gidir and Duduble. The Habar Gidir are also a sub-clan of the Hawiye. This gives the Habar Gidir immediate lineal ties with the other Hawiye sub-clans. The Hawiye descend from Irir Samaale who was one of the sons of Samaale. Due to this the Habar Gidir also have kinship with the Dir  (Irir) and the other Samaale clans.

Ethmology

The Habar Gidir are a Hiraab sub-clan. The forefather of the clan is Madarkicis and Habar Gidir is the name of their Mother. Madarkicis is part of the Hiraab section of Hawiye. Madarkicis translates to "gathering agitator'' or ''meeting disruptor" in the Somali language.

Distribution

The Habar Gidir primarily live in the central regions of Mudug and Galgaduud in Galmudug. The clan also lives in Southern Somalia especially in (Matabaan district) and sections of (Mogadishu). The clan also lives in the Somali Region of Ethiopia in particular the areas neighboring Galmudug. In addition to this the Habar Gidir can also be found in the expatriate communities of the Somali diaspora.

Role and influence in Somalia

The Habar Gidir clan has produced many prominent Somali figures. The first Prime Minister of Somalia Abdullahi Issa Mohamud  was from this clan, he was Habargidir, Sa'ad, Reer Nima'ale.  Somalia's fifth president Abdiqasim Salad Hassan was also a member and hailed form the Habagidir, Ayr, Absiiye. They have also held many other important and high ranking positions in governance with a large variety that includes Minister of Economic Affairs, Minister of Foreign Affairs, head of Somali National Security, chief of staff of the Somali armed forces, defence minister, and many more. The current Prime Minister of Somalia Mohamed Hussein Roble hails from this clan.

References

Hawiye clan
Somali clans in Ethiopia